Isarapa Imprasertsuk (born 11 May 1995) is a Thai sport shooter, born in Bangkok. She won a silver medal in skeet at the 2016 Asian Shotgun Championships.

She qualified to represent Thailand at the 2020 Summer Olympics in Tokyo 2021, where ahe placed fourth in women's skeet.

References

1995 births
Living people
Isarapa Imprasertsuk
Isarapa Imprasertsuk
Shooters at the 2020 Summer Olympics
Isarapa Imprasertsuk
Asian Games medalists in shooting
Shooters at the 2010 Asian Games
Shooters at the 2014 Asian Games
Isarapa Imprasertsuk
Medalists at the 2010 Asian Games
Medalists at the 2014 Asian Games
Isarapa Imprasertsuk